This is a list of alumni of Franklin & Marshall College in Lancaster, Pennsylvania.

Arts
Richard Altick, Class of 1936, literary scholar known for his pioneering contributions to Victorian Studies, as well as for championing both the joys and the rigorous methods of literary research
Franklin Schaffner, Class of 1942, Oscar-winning film director (Patton, Planet of the Apes)
Glen Tetley, Class of 1946, choreographer
Ed Flesh, Class of 1953, art director, designed wheel for Wheel of Fortune
Roy Scheider, Class of 1955, Academy Award-nominated actor (Jaws and All That Jazz)
Dick Orkin, Class of 1956, radio announcer and commercial producer
James Lapine, Class of 1971, Pulitzer Prize-winning and Tony Award-winning playwright (Sunday in the Park with George, Into the Woods)
Bruce Sussman. Class of 1971, Songwriter and librettist.
Treat Williams, Class of 1973, actor (Hair, Prince of the City, TV's Everwood)
Richard Plepler, Class of 1981, CEO of HBO
Jennifer Gareis, Class of 1992, actress (TV's The Bold and the Beautiful, The Young and the Restless)
Spliff Star, Class of 1996, rapper and hypeman for MC Busta Rhymes
Jason Narvy, Class of 2002, actor (Mighty Morphin' Power Rangers)
Jennifer Stanley, cozy mystery author
Dominic Akena, xylophone player, subject of Emmy-winning documentary War/Dance; member of the Delta Sigma Phi fraternity

Government and law
John Weinland Killinger, Class of 1843, U.S. Congressman from Pennsylvania (1859–1863, 1871–1875, 1877–1881) 
Thomas Bard McFarland (1828–1908), associate justice of the Supreme Court of California
Daniel Ermentrout (1837-1899), U.S. Congressman from Pennsylvania's 8th congressional district (1881-1889), U.S. Congressman from Pennsylvania's 9th congressional district (1897-1899), Pennsylvania State Senator from the 1st district (1873-1887)
J. Roland Kinzer, Class of 1896, U.S. Congressman from Pennsylvania (1930–1947)
George Kunkel, Class of 1915, Pennsylvania State Senator (1937-1941)
Guy K. Bard, Class of 1916, Judge of the United States District Court for the Eastern District of Pennsylvania
William I. Troutman, Class of 1927, Judge and U.S. Congressman from Pennsylvania (1943–1945)
John P. Saylor, Class of 1929, member of U.S. House of Representatives, environmental advocate
Eugene Shirk, Mayor of Reading, Pennsylvania (1964–1968, 1972–1976) 
Edwin D. Eshleman, Class of 1942, U.S. Congressman from Pennsylvania (1967–1977)
Clarence Newcomer (1923–2005), Class of 1944, Judge of the United States District Court for the Eastern District of Pennsylvania
Ronald Buckwalter, Class of 1958, Judge of the United States District Court for the Eastern District of Pennsylvania
William H. Gray, Class of 1963, U.S. Congressman from Pennsylvania (1979–1991); House Majority Whip (1989–1991); President of United Negro College Fund (1991–2004)
Robert J. Kafin, Class of 1963, civic leader and environmentalist
Kenneth Duberstein, Class of 1965, White House Chief of Staff under Ronald Reagan
Liam O'Grady, Class of 1973, Judge of the United States District Court for the Eastern District of Virginia
The Hon. D. Brooks Smith, Class of 1973, Judge on the United States Court of Appeals for the Third Circuit (2002–present); former Judge on the United States District Court for the Western District of Pennsylvania (1988–2002); Chief Judge (2001–2002)
Jeffrey M. Lacker, Class of 1977, President of the Federal Reserve Bank, Richmond, Virginia
Mary Schapiro, Class of 1977, former Chair of the U.S. Securities and Exchange Commission
Patricia Harris, Class of 1977, former First Deputy Mayor for the City of New York; current CEO of Bloomberg Philanthropies
Paula Dow, Class of 1977, Attorney General of New Jersey (2010–2012)
Tim Canova, Class of 1982, law professor and candidate for U.S. House of Representatives
Edward George Smith, Class of 1983, Judge of the United States District Court for the Eastern District of Pennsylvania
Ken Mehlman, Class of 1988, campaign manager for George H. W. Bush, former chairman of the United States Republican Party, 2005–2007
Evelyn Farkas, Class of 1989, former Deputy Assistant Secretary of Defense for Russia/Ukraine/Eurasia
Barry Finegold, Class of 1993, Massachusetts State Senator
Daniel Ragsdale, former Acting Director of Immigration & Customs Enforcement
Rob Teplitz, Pennsylvania State Senator

Business
George Frederick Baer, Class of 1861, President of the Philadelphia and Reading Railroad
Wanda Austin, Class of 1975, president and CEO of The Aerospace Corporation
Rob Shepardson, Class of 1983, founding partner of advertising agency SS+K
Jacob Clark Hennebberger, Class of 1913, co-founder of Weird Tales magazine (1923)
J. M. Lansinger, Class of 1914, co-founder of Weird Tales and publisher of College Humor
Neil C. Krauter, commercial insurance industry executive

Science and medicine
Stanley Dudrick, Class of 1957, surgeon, pioneered the use of TPN
Charles M. Lieber, Class of 1981, chemist, pioneer in nanoscience; in 2021 guilty of federal charges related to Chinese research funding 
Theodore E. Woodward, Class of 1934, Nobel Prize nominee; medical researcher
David Simons, Class of 1943, NASA physician, established altitude record of 102,000 feet in a helium balloon in 1957, testing equipment that would be used by astronauts
Michael J. Mumma, Class of 1963, NASA, Founding Director of the Goddard Center for Astrobiology and Senior Scientist, Solar System Exploration Division.
Alan I. Leshner, Class of 1965, Director National Institute of Drug Abuse 1994-2001
David A. Ansell, Class of 1974, doctor and author
Elizabeth Cascio, Class of 1997, economist studying the economic impact of policies affecting education
Justin B. Ries, Class of 1998, geoscientist and inventor known for discoveries in the field of global oceanic change
Anne Hultgren, Class of 1999, Physicist, Department of Homeland Security
William Bevan, former president of the American Psychological Association

Athletics
Frank Sprig Gardner, Class of 1930, National Wrestling Hall of Fame (1986); Franklin & Marshall College Athletic Hall of Fame (wrestling, 1992) 
Bowie Kuhn, Class of 1948, Commissioner of Baseball (1969–1984)
Don Wert, attended in 1957, MLB player for 1968 World Series champion Detroit Tigers
J. Andrew Noel, Class of 1972, wrestling coach and athletic director at Cornell University
Jeff Rineer, attended 1974–75, former MLB pitcher
Peter Schaffer, Class of 1984, sports agent; columnist for Washington Post;  star of Esquire Network docuseries The Agent 
Michael T. Dee, Class of 1985, CEO, San Diego Padres (2009–2016)
Matt Steinmetz, Class of 1986, journalist and sportscaster
Chris Finch, Class of 1992, assistant coach of NBA's New Orleans Pelicans, Houston Rockets
Rebecca Meyers, Class of 2021, Paralympic Games swimmer who won three gold medals at the 2016 Summer Paralympics

Religion
Willam R. Rathvon, CSB, Class of 1873, Christian Science practitioner, lecturer, church director and the only known eyewitness of Lincoln's Gettysburg Address to leave an audio recording of his impressions
Rev. Earl Honaman, BA, Class of 1925, former Episcopal Bishop of Central New York; Army Chaplain in World War II during the Battle of the Bulge
Metropolitan Tikhon, class of 1988.
Richard Druckenbrod, United Church of Christ pastor and Pennsylvania German linguist

Academia
David Bowman Schneder, Class of 1880, second President of Tohoku Gakuin University (1857–1936)  
William Edwin Hoy, class of 1882, founder of Tohoku Gakuin University; missionary to Japan and China, (1888–1927) 
Andrew Truxal, Class of 1920, president of Hood College and Anne Arundel Community College
Richard J. Stonesifer Class of 1944, fifth President of Monmouth University (1971–1979)
James J. Whalen, Class of 1950, president of Ithaca College (1975–1992)
Richard Kneedler, Class of 1965, President Emeritus of Franklin and Marshall College
Keith Hamm, Class of 1969, Edwards Professor of Political Science at Rice University
LeRoy Pernell (1971), former dean of Florida A&M University College of Law & Northern Illinois University College of Law
Paul R. Brown, Class of 1972, eighth president of Monmouth University
Louise Burkhart, Class of 1980, ethnohistorian and scholar of Mesoamerican literature; professor of anthropology at University at Albany, SUNY
Henry Kulp Ober, former President of Elizabethtown College

Military
Henry Kyd Douglas (1838-1903), Class of 1858, studied law in Lexington, VA and admitted to bar in Charleston, VA; major in the Confederate States Army (1861-1865), youngest Civil War officer of Stonewall Jackson; later Adjutant General of the Maryland Army National Guard; author of published manuscript memoir, "I Rode with Stonewall" (1940).
Richard Winters, Class of 1941, WWII officer and veteran of D Day, Market Garden, Carentan and the Battle of The Bulge; main character in Band of Brothers; member of Delta Sigma Phi fraternity
Richard P. Mills, Class of 1972, Lieutenant General, USMC Deputy Commandant for Combat Development and Integration and Commanding General, Marine Corps Combat Development Command

Other
Bruce Bechdel, Class of 1955, high school teacher, funeral director and subject of his daughter Alison's 2006 graphic memoir Fun Home and its 2013 musical adaptation
Jeffrey Lord, Class of 1973, political analyst, most noted as a CNN surrogate for President Donald Trump
Clifford Pickover, Class of 1979, author and IBM researcher
Scott Ritter, Class of 1979, former U.N. Weapons Inspector
Mallika Dua, Indian comic

References

Franklin and Marshall alumni
Confederate States Army officers